Iphigenia socotrana is a species of plant in the family Colchicaceae. It is endemic to the island of Socotra in the Indian Ocean, part of the Republic of Yemen.  Its natural habitats are subtropical or tropical dry shrubland and rocky areas.

References

Colchicaceae
Endemic flora of Socotra
Least concern plants
Taxonomy articles created by Polbot